Félipe Enríquez (born 21 February 1961) is a Mexican former cyclist. He competed in the team time trial event at the 1984 Summer Olympics.

References

External links
 

1961 births
Living people
Mexican male cyclists
Olympic cyclists of Mexico
Cyclists at the 1984 Summer Olympics
Sportspeople from Mexico City
Pan American Games medalists in cycling
Pan American Games bronze medalists for Mexico
Medalists at the 1987 Pan American Games